Claude-Godefroy Coquart (February 2, 1706 – July 4, 1765) was a Jesuit priest who probably arrived in Quebec in 1739. He was almost immediately assigned to accompany La Vérendrye to the western forts. He was to replace Father Jean-Pierre Aulneau who had died in the massacre on  Lake of the Woods in 1736.

They left for the west in June, 1741 and Coquart was left at either  Fort Michilimackinac or  Fort Kaministiquia because of the riskiness of starting a new mission further west. We do know that he was aware of, and wrote about La Colle's raid on the Sioux of the Prairies in 1741. Coquart joined the La Vérendryes at Fort La Reine in 1743 and returned east with the senior La Vérendrye when La Vérendrye lost the commandant post in 1744. He was the first recorded missionary in present-day Manitoba and the first to travel so far west.

See also 

 Jean-Pierre Aulneau
 Charles-Michel Mesaiger

References 
 
 Metis Culture 1741-1742
 
 

People from Melun
1706 births
1765 deaths
Roman Catholic missionaries in Canada
French Roman Catholic missionaries
18th-century French Jesuits
Jesuit missionaries in New France